Nathaniel Moore (1884–1910) was an American Olympic golfer.

Nat, Nathan, or Nathaniel Moore may also refer to:

 Nat Moore (born 1951), American football player
 Nathan Moore (American musician), American musician of ThaMuseMeant and Surprise Me Mr. Davis
 Nathan Moore (English musician), English singer, member of Brother Beyond
 Nathaniel Fish Moore (1782–1872), president of Columbia College
 Nathaniel G. Moore, Canadian writer

Places
 Nathan G. Moore House
 Nathaniel Moore Banta House